Henri Nassiet (1895–1977) was a French actor.

Selected filmography

 Maman Pierre (1922)
 La griffe du hasard (1937) - Séverac (uncredited)
 Life Dances On (1937) - Un policier
 L'innocent (1938) - Gregor
 La Glu (1938) - Le juge d'instruction
 Ma soeur de lait (1938) - Le second régisseur
 Fort Dolorès (1939)
 The Five Cents of Lavarede (1939) - Jack
 Behind the Facade (1939) - Minor rôle (uncredited)
 The End of the Day (1939) - Gaston Noblet
 Nightclub Hostess (1939) - Freddy
 The Phantom Carriage (1939) - Gustave
 Fire in the Straw (1939) - Despagnat
 Madame Sans-Gêne (1941) - Le maréchal Lefebvre
 Les affaires sont les affaires (1942) - Dauphin
 La Grande Marnière (1943) - Le président du tribunal
 À la Belle frégate (1943) - Victor
 Jericho (1946) - Le commandant Munchhausen
 Mensonges (1946) - Le docteur Charles Leroux
 Le Bataillon du ciel (1947) - Bouvier
 Fausse identité (1947) - Georges Blondin
 Cab Number 13 (1948) - Le duc de la Tour Vaudieu (segments "Delitto" & "Castigo")
 Le cavalier de Croix-Mort (1948) - Vidocq
 La bataille du feu (1949) - Le colonel
 Mission in Tangier (1949) - Alexandre Segard
 Singoalla (1949) - Le chef gitan Latzo / Gypsy Chief (French version)
 On n'aime qu'une fois (1950) - Monsieur de Bolestac
 La grande vie (1951) - M. Charles
 Ouvert contre X... (1952) - L'industriel Paul Dorgères
 The Drunkard (1953) - Le docteur Marignan
 Le Guérisseur (1953) - Le Goff
 The Lowest Crime (1955) - Maître Rougier - l'avocat d'Edouard Brisse
 Goubbiah, mon amour (1956) - Goubbiah's Father
 Cela s'appelle l'aurore (1956) - Angela's father
 Les Aventures de Till L'Espiègle (1956) - Marnix
 Michel Strogoff (1956) - Ivan Ogareff
 It's All Adam's Fault (1958) - Monsieur Gillet
 Le Saint mène la danse (1960) - Louis, le chauffeur
 Bernadette of Lourdes (1961) - Le curé Peyramale
 The President (1961) - Un ministre
 The Three Musketeers (1961) - M. de Treville
 The Triumph of Michael Strogoff (1961)
 Bay of Angels (1963) - M. Fournier - le père de Jean
 The Monocle Laughs (1964) - The Colonel
 Les petits chats (1965)
 The Things of Life (1970) - M. Bérard, le père de Pierre
 Law Breakers (1971) - Le président du tribunal
 Le Fils (1973)
 Le monde était plein de couleurs (1973) - Le vieux maître (final film role)

References

1895 births
1977 deaths
French male film actors
French male television actors
French male stage actors
20th-century French male actors